The 2014 Sun Belt Conference baseball tournament was held at Eddie Stanky Field on the campus of the University of South Alabama in Mobile, Alabama from May 21 to May 25, 2014.  The tournament used a double-elimination format.  Louisiana–Lafayette won the tournament, earning the Sun Belt Conference's automatic bid to the 2014 NCAA Division I baseball tournament.  The league was expected to divide into two six team divisions for 2014, but due to the departures of three baseball playing schools the plan was shelved, possibly to be implemented in 2015 with the additions of Appalachian State and Georgia Southern.

Seeding
The top eight teams (based on conference results) from the conference earned invites to the tournament.  The teams were seeded based on conference winning percentage, and then played a two bracket, double-elimination tournament.  The winner of each bracket played a championship final.

Results

All-Tournament Team
The following players were named to the All-Tournament Team. Louisiana–Lafayette's Blake Trahan, one of four Ragin' Cajuns selected, was named Most Outstanding Player.

References

Tournament
Sun Belt Conference Baseball Tournament
Sun Belt Conference baseball tournament
Sun Belt Conference baseball tournament